An acropolis is a "high city" or citadel.

Acropolis or Akropolis may also refer to:

 Acropolis, a neighborhood of modern Athens near the ancient monument, also known as Makrygianni, Athens
 Acropolis of Athens, ancient citadel located on a high rocky outcrop above the city of Athens
 Acropolis of Rhodes, the acropolis of ancient Rhodes (city)
 Acropolis (butterfly), a genus in the family Nymphalidae
 Akropolis (Vilnius), the largest shopping mall in Lithuania
 Akropolis (Kaunas), the fourth largest shopping mall in Lithuania
 Akropolis (Klaipėda), the sixth largest shopping mall in Lithuania
 Akropolis (newspaper), a Greek newspaper based in Athens
 Acropolis (play) by Robert E. Sherwood (1933) 
 The Acropolis (mountain), in Tasmania

See also 
 Acropolis Rally, racing competition in Greece
 Acropolis Tournament, basketball international tournament